The  Hotel Intourist Palace  is a luxury hotel in Batumi, Georgia.

The hotel is located in the very centre of Batumi, on the seaside Ninoshvili boulevard on the Black Sea. Established in 1939, the hotel has since been an accommodation for over 450,000 foreign travellers, politician, diplomats, businessmen, and sportsmen. International conferences, symposiums and forums have also been held in the hotel.

The hotel has a notable casino, two restaurants, an open-air pool, an ATM in the lobby, a spa with sauna, Turkish bath, fitness centre and a range of massages.

References

External links

Hotels in Georgia (country)
Buildings and structures in Batumi
Hotels built in the Soviet Union
Hotels established in 1939
Hotel buildings completed in 1939